Gevar-e Sofla (also Romanized as Gevar-e Soflá; also known as Gevar-e Pā’īn) is a village in Gevar Rural District, Sarduiyeh District, Jiroft County, Kerman Province, Iran. At the 2006 census, its population was 446, in 124 families.

References 

Populated places in Jiroft County